Dallas Buyers Club is a 2013 American biographical drama film directed by Jean-Marc Vallée based on a screenplay written by Craig Borten and Melisa Wallack. Matthew McConaughey stars as Ron Woodroof, an AIDS patient who smuggles unapproved AIDS drug treatments into Texas and establishes the titular club where he distributes them amongst other AIDS sufferers whilst opposed by the Food and Drug Administration. Jared Leto and Jennifer Garner feature in supporting roles.

Dallas Buyers Club premiered at the Toronto International Film Festival on September 7, 2013. Focus Features initially gave the film a limited release at nine theaters on November 1 before expanding it on November 22 to over 600 theaters in the United States and Canada. The film grossed a worldwide total of over $55 million on a production budget of $5 million. Rotten Tomatoes, a review aggregator, surveyed 255 reviews and judged 93% to be positive.

Dallas Buyers Club received awards and nominations in a variety of categories with particular praise for the performances of McConaughey and Leto. At the 86th Academy Awards, the film received six nominations, including Best Picture, Best Original Screenplay, Best Actor for McConaughey, and Best Supporting Actor for Leto. McConaughey and Leto went on to win their respective categories—only the fifth film in Oscars history to win both awards. Hairstylist Adruitha Lee, and makeup artist Robin Mathews won for Best Makeup and Hairstyling. Mathews' makeup budget for the film was only $250. At the 71st Golden Globe Awards, McConaughey won for Best Actor – Motion Picture Drama, and Leto won for Best Supporting Actor – Motion Picture.

At the Screen Actors Guild Awards the film had three nominations, winning Best Actor for McConaughey and Best Supporting Actor for Leto. Borten and Wallack's screenplay was also nominated for Best Original Screenplay at the Writers Guild of America Awards. The National Board of Review named Dallas Buyers Club one of the top ten independent films of 2013.

Recognitions

See also
 2013 in film

References

External links
 

Lists of accolades by film